The 2022–23 season is Cliftonville's 133rd season in the top flight of the Northern Ireland Football League having never been relegated since the leagues formation in 1890.  In addition to the domestic league, they will also compete in the Irish Cup, the League Cup and the County Antrim Shield.

Pre-season and friendlies 
Cliftonville F.C. played a total of eight pre-season friendlies including one against Shamrock Rovers F.C.. Their main results are shown in the table below.

Competitions

Overall Record

Transfers

In

On Loan

Out

References 

Cliftonville F.C. seasons
Cliftonville